Saint Christina or Christine may refer to:

Saint Christina of Persia, 6th century (feast day: March 13)
Saint Christina of Bolsena (Christina of Tyre, Christina the Great Martyr), (feast day: July 24)
Saint Christina the Astonishing (1150–1224), (feast day: July 24)
Blessed Christina von Stommeln (1242–1312), (feast day: 6 November)

See also
St. Christine School
Santa Cristina (disambiguation)
Sainte-Christine (disambiguation)
Christina (disambiguation)